Richard William Wakefield Pollock (7 May 1935 – 1 October 2022) was a linguist, teacher and translator.  He was the personal translator for Margaret Thatcher when meeting Russian leaders, especially Mikhail Gorbachev.

References

1935 births
2022 deaths
Alumni of Merton College, Oxford
Alumni of Peterhouse, Cambridge
Linguists
People from Nottingham
People educated at Bristol Grammar School